
Gmina Zduny is an urban-rural gmina (administrative district) in Krotoszyn County, Greater Poland Voivodeship, in west-central Poland.

Villages
Apart from the town of Zduny, Gmina Zduny contains the villages and settlements of Baszków, Bestwin, Chachalnia, Dziewiąte, Hadrianów, Konarzew, Ostatni Grosz, Perzyce, Piaski, Rochy, Ruda, Siejew, Szczerków and Trzaski.

Neighbouring gminas
Gmina Zduny is bordered by the town of Sulmierzyce and by the gminas of Cieszków, Jutrosin, Kobylin, Krotoszyn and Milicz.

References
Polish official population figures 2006

Zduny
Gmina Zduny